Barbie Sparkling Ice Show is a 2002 video game within the Barbie franchise developed by Australian developer Krome Studios and published by Vivendi Universal Games for Windows. 38 people who worked on this title would contribute to The Adventures of Jimmy Neutron: Boy Genius - Jet Fusion Nicole Stark served as a lead animator.

Reception
7Wolf wrote that the game was "pleasant - relaxing, and most importantly not annoying". EdutainingKids praised the engaging graphics and ability to be learnt quickly. The Odyssy Online wrote the game was difficult to play for non skaters.  Emily Aguilo-Perez of  2015 Strong Research Fellow wrote that the game was an example of how she observed "Barbie permeat[ing] children’s culture through...media". Twiinfinite deemed it a classic of the console generation, alongside Ocarina of Tim and Final Fantasy VII and compared it to Animal Crossing saying "just trust us on this".

It received a 'Recommended' from Parent's Choice for Winter 2002 Software.

References

External links 
 

2002 video games
Barbie video games
Sports video games
Video games developed in Australia
Windows games
Windows-only games